Winston Churchill (1874–1965) was Prime Minister of the United Kingdom.

Winston Churchill may also refer to:

Other people
 Winston Churchill (Cavalier), English soldier, historian, politician and ancestor of the prime minister
 Winston Churchill (novelist) (1871–1947), American novelist
 Winston Churchill (1940–2010), member of the UK parliament and grandson of the prime minister

Ships
 Sir Winston Churchill (schooner), a sail training ship launched in 1966
 MS Winston Churchill, a ferry launched in 1966 and scrapped in 2004
 SS Winston Churchill, a British cargo ship in service 1945–52
 USS Winston S. Churchill (DDG-81), a US Navy missile destroyer

Other uses 
Cuvée Sir Winston Churchill, a type of champagne made by Pol Roger
SR Battle of Britain class 21C151 Winston Churchill, a steam locomotive
 Winston Churchill, a fictional cat in Pet Sematary
 Winston Churchill, a fictional cat in The Cat Who... series

People with the given names
Winston Churchill Rea (born 1950s), a Northern Irish loyalist activist

See also
Churchill (disambiguation)
 Winston Churchill High School (disambiguation)